Lai Ka Fai (born 30 May 1983 in Hong Kong), is a former Hong Kong professional footballer and the current head coach of Hong Kong Premier League club Rangers.

Club career

Sun Hei
On 2 June 2008, reports claimed that fellow First Division club Sun Hei was negotiating with Bulova Rangers for Lai's possible transfer. In July 2008, Lai joined Sun Hei for an undisclosed fee.

After the 2010–11 season, he left Sun Hei and joined newly-promotion First Division club Mutual. However, since Mutual refused promotion due to lack of sponsorship, Mutual was banned from Hong Kong league system for a season. Lai thus became a free agent.

Fukien
In the 2011–12 season, Lai joined Third 'A' Division club Fukien on a free transfer after being released by Mutual. He was appointed as the captain for the season. He scored a hat-trick against St. Joseph's on 20 November 2011, including two penalties.

Mutual
In July 2012, Lai rejoined Fourth Division club Mutual.

Rangers
On 8 June 2013, Lai joined First Division club Rangers for the third time on a free transfer.

Career statistics

Club
 As of 13 May 2013. Stats starting from the 2007–08 season.

Notes 
1.  Others include Hong Kong Third Division Champion Play-off.
2.  Since these clubs were competing in lower divisions, they could only join the Junior Shield instead of Senior Shield.

Honors

Club
Sun Hei
Hong Kong League Cup (1): 2008–09

References

External links
 
 HKFA

1983 births
Hong Kong footballers
Association football defenders
Hong Kong First Division League players
Double Flower FA players
Hong Kong Rangers FC players
Citizen AA players
Sun Hei SC players
Mutual FC players
Living people
Hong Kong football managers